The Magickal Mystery D Tour EP is an EP by Psychic TV.

It charted in the UK Top 75 at No 65 on 20 September 1986.

Track listing

Temple Records TOPY 023, 7" vinyl
Side A
"Good Vibrations"
Side B
"Roman P."

Temple Records TOPY 23T & TOPY 23 DJ, 12" vinyl
Side A
"Good Vibrations (Kundalini Mix)"
Co-producer - Ken Thomas
Mixed By - Phil Harding
"Hex-Sex (Voodoo Mix)"
Side B
"Roman P. (Fireball Mix)"
Co-producer - Ken Thomas
Mixed By - Mark Freegard
"Interzone"

Temple Records TOPY 23P & RCA Limited Australia and New Zealand 104611, 7" vinyl
Side A
"Good Vibrations"
Co-producer - Ken Thomas
"Interzone"
Side B
"Roman P."
Co-producer - Ken Thomas
"Hex-Sex"

Temple Records TOPY 23 D, 2x7" vinyl
Side "A"
"Good Vibrations"
Mixed By - Phil Harding
"Interzone"
Side "AA"
"Roman P."
Mixed By - Mark Freegard
"Hex-Sex"
Side "AAA"
"Godstar (Ugly Mix)"
Side "AAAA"
"Je T'aime (Menstrual Mix)"

Charts

References

Psychic TV albums
1986 EPs